Giuseppe Ferrerio (1554–1610) was a Roman Catholic prelate who served as Archbishop of Urbino (1597–1610) and Titular Archbishop of Colossae (1593–1597).

Biography
Giuseppe Ferrerio was born in Savona, Italy in 1554.
On 15 March 1593, he was appointed during the papacy of Pope Clement VIII as Titular Archbishop of Colossae and Coadjutor Archbishop of Urbino.
In 1597, he succeeded to the bishopric.
He served as Archbishop of Urbino until his death on 16 March 1610.

Episcopal succession
While bishop, he was the principal co-consecrator of:

References

External links and additional sources
 (for Chronology of Bishops) 
 (for Chronology of Bishops) 
 (for Chronology of Bishops) 
 (for Chronology of Bishops) 

16th-century Italian Roman Catholic archbishops
17th-century Italian Roman Catholic archbishops
Bishops appointed by Pope Clement VIII
1554 births
1610 deaths